Dactylysin (peptide hormone inactivating endopeptidase, PHIE) is an enzyme. This enzyme catalyses the following chemical reaction

 Hydrolysis of peptides of at least six residues, with bulky hydrophobic residues in the P1' position. Shows a preference for hydrophobic doublets such as -Phe-Phe- and -Phe-Leu- in somatostatin-(1-14)-peptide and dynorphin A-(1-6)-peptide, respectively

This endopeptidase in the skin of the amphibian, Xenopus laevis.

References

External links 
 

EC 3.4.24